The ICD-10 Procedure Coding System (ICD-10-PCS) is an international system of medical classification used for procedural coding. The Centers for Medicare and Medicaid Services, the agency responsible for maintaining the inpatient procedure code set in the U.S., contracted with 3M Health Information Systems in 1995 to design and then develop a procedure classification system to replace Volume 3 of ICD-9-CM. ICD-9-CM contains a procedure classification; ICD-10-CM does not. ICD-10-PCS is the result. ICD-10-PCS was initially released in 1998. It has been updated annually since that time.

Section structure
Each code consists of seven alphanumeric characters. The first character is the 'section'. The second through seventh characters mean different things in each section. Each character can be any of 34 possible values the ten digits 0-9 and the 24 letters A-H, J-N and P-Z may be used in each character. The letters O and I are excluded to avoid confusion with the numbers 0 and 1. There are no decimals in ICD-10-PCS

Of the 72,081 codes in ICD-10-PCS, 62,022 are in the first section, "Medical and surgical".

Root operations
For medical/surgical, these are the root operation codes:

00 alteration; 01 bypass; 02 change; 03 control; 04 creation; 05 destruction; 06 detachment; 07 dilation; 08 division; 09 drainage; 0B excision; 0C extirpation; 0D extraction; 0F fragmentation; 0G fusion; 0H insertion; 0J inspection; 0K map; 0L occlusion; 0M reattachment; 0N release; 0P removal; 0Q repair; 0R replacement; 0S reposition; 0T resection; 0U supplement ; 0V restriction; 0W revision; 0X transfer; 0Y transplantation

They can be grouped into several categories:

 take out or eliminate all or a portion of a body part: excision (sigmoid polypectomy), resection (total nephrectomy), extraction (toenail extraction), destruction (rectal polyp fulguration), detachment (below knee amputation). For biopsies, "extraction" is used when force is required (as with endometrial biopsy), and "excision" is used when minimal force is involved (as with liver biopsy). See also ectomy.
 involve putting in or on, putting back, or moving living body part: transplantation (heart transplant), reattachment (finger reattachment), reposition (reposition undescended testicle), transfer (tendon transfer)
 take out or eliminate solid matter, fluids, or gases from a body part: drainage (incision and drainage), extirpation (thrombectomy), fragmentation (lithotripsy of gallstones)
 only involve examination of body parts and regions: inspection (diagnostic arthroscopy), map (cardiac mapping)
 involve putting in or on, putting back, or moving living body part: bypass (gastrojejunal bypass), dilation (coronary artery dilation), occlusion (fallopian tube ligation), restriction (cervical cerclage)
 always involve devices: insertion (pacemaker insertion), replacement (total hip replacement), supplement (herniorrhaphy using mesh), removal (cardiac pacemaker removal), change (drainage tube change), revision (hip prosthesis adjustment)
 involve cutting and separation only: division (osteotomy), release (peritoneal adhesiolysis)
 involving other repair: control (control of postprostatectomy bleeding), repair (suture of laceration)
 with other objectives: alteration (face lift), creation (artificial vagina creation), fusion (spinal fusion)

Regions

See also

ICD-10 Clinical Modification

References

Clinical procedure classification